{{Automatic taxobox
|taxon = Teretia
|image = Teretia strongyla 001.jpg
|image_caption = Shell of Teretia strongyla (museum specimen at MNHN, Paris)
|authority = Norman, 1888
|synonyms_ref = 
|synonyms =
 Azorilla F. Nordsieck, 1968
 Daphnella (Teres)
 Teres Bucquoy, Dautzenberg & Dollfus, 1883 (Invalid: junior homonym of Teres Boettger, 1878; Teretia is an emendation used as a replacement name)
|type_species= † Pleurotoma anceps Eichwald, 1830
|subdivision_ranks = Species
|subdivision = See text
|display_parents = 3
}}Teretia is a genus of sea snails, marine gastropod mollusks in the family Raphitomidae.

Species
Species within the genus Teretia include:
 Teretia acus (Barnard, 1958)
 † Teretia anceps (Eichwald, 1830)
 Teretia candelae Horro & Rolán, 2017
 † Teretia cincta (Seguenza, 1880) 
 † Teretia elegantissima (Foresti, 1868) 
 † Teretia fusianceps F. Nordsieck, 1972 
 † Teretia guersi Schnetler, 2005 
 Teretia hoisaeteri Horro & Rolán, 2017
 † Teretia horroi Landau, Van Dingenen & Ceulemans, 2020
 † Teretia intermedia (Foresti, 1874) 
 Teretia megalembryon (Dautzenberg & Fischer, 1896)
 † Teretia monterosatoi (Cipolla, 1914) 
 † Teretia multicingula (Seguenza, 1880) 
 † Teretia nana (Hornung, 1920) 
 Teretia neocaledonica Morassi & Bonfitto, 2015
 † Teretia oligocaenica Lozouet, 2017 
 † Teretia pentacarinifera Vera-Peláez, 2002 
 † Teretia policarinarum Vera-Peláez, 2002 
 Teretia sysoevi Morassi & Bonfitto, 2015
 Teretia tavianii Morassi & Bonfitto, 2015
 Teretia teres (Reeve, 1844)
 Teretia tongaensis Morassi & Bonfitto, 2015 
 † Teretia turritelloides (Bellardi, 1847) 
Species brought into synonymy
 Teretia aperta Dall, 1927: synonym of Teretiopsis thaumastopsis (Dautzenberg & Fischer, 1896)
 Teretia strongyla (Dall, 1927): synonym of Teretia megalembryon (Dautzenberg & H. Fischer, 1896)
 Teretia thaumastopsis (Dautzenberg & Fischer, 1896): synonym of Teretiopsis thaumastopsis'' (Dautzenberg & H. Fischer, 1896)

References

 Norman, A.M. (1888) Museum Normanianum. IV. Mollusca Marina. T. Caldcleugh, Durham, 29 pp

External links
 Bucquoy E., Dautzenberg P. & Dollfus G. (1882-1886). Les mollusques marins du Roussillon. Tome Ier. Gastropodes. Paris: Baillière & fils. 570 pp., 66 pls. [pp. 1-40, pls 1-5, February 1882; pp. 41-84, pls 6-10, August 1882; pp. 85-135, pls 11-15, February 1883; pp. 136-196, pls 16-20, August 1883; pp. 197-222, pls 21-25, January 1884; pp. 223-258, pls 26-30, February 1884; pp. 259-298, pls 31-35, August 1884; pp. 299-342, pls 36-40, September 1884; pp. 343-386, pls 41-45, February 1885; pp. 387-418, pls 46-50, August 1885; pp. 419-454, pls 51-60, January 1886; pp. 455-486, pls 56-60, April 1886; pp. 487-570, pls 61-66, October 1886)
  Norman A.M. (1888). Museum Normanianum, or a catalogue of the Invertebrata of Europe, and the Arctic North Atlantic Oceans. IV Mollusca marina. V. Brachiopoda. Durham, privately printed. 30 pp
  Brunetti & Vecchi, Sul ritrovamento di Teretia elengatissima Foresti, 1868 in terreni pliocenici dell'Emilia e della Toscana; Bollettino della Società paleontologica Italiana; volume 42, n. 1-2, 2003
 Morassi M. & Bonfitto A. (2015). New Indo-Pacific species of the genus Teretia Norman, 1888 (Gastropoda: Raphitomidae). Zootaxa. 3911(4): 560-570
 Bellardi L. (1877), I molluschi dei terreni terziarii del Piemonte e della Liguria /
 
 Worldwide Mollusc Species Data Base: Raphitomidae

 
Raphitomidae